Leapfrogging, also known as island hopping, was a military strategy employed by the Allies in the Pacific War against the Empire of Japan during World War II.

The key idea is to bypass heavily fortified enemy islands instead of trying to capture every island in sequence en route to a final target. The reasoning is that those islands can simply be cut off from their supply chains (leading to their eventual capitulation) rather than needing to be overwhelmed by superior force, thus speeding up progress and reducing losses of troops and material.

Background 
By the late 19th century, the U.S. had several interests in the western Pacific to defend; namely, access to the Chinese market, and its colonies – the Philippines and Guam – which the U.S. had gained as a result of the Spanish–American War (1898).  After Japan's victories in the Sino-Japanese War (1894–95) and the Russo-Japanese War of 1904, the U.S. began to regard Japan as a potential threat to its interests in the western Pacific.  This antagonism was intensified by Japan's objections to an attempt to annex Hawaii to the U.S. (1893) and by Japan's objections to discrimination against Japanese immigrants both in Hawaii (1897) – on this occasion, Japan sent the cruiser Naniwa to Honolulu, Hawaii – and in California (1906, 1913).  As a result, the U.S. Navy began to draft, as early as 1897, war plans against Japan, which were eventually code-named "War Plan Orange".  The war plan of 1911, which was drafted under Rear Admiral Raymond P. Rodgers, included an island-hopping strategy for approaching Japan.

After World War I, the Versailles Treaty gave Japan a mandate over former German colonies in the western Pacific; specifically, the Mariana, Marshall, and the Caroline Islands.  If these islands were fortified, Japan could, in principle, deny the U.S. access to its interests in the western Pacific.  Therefore, in 1921, Major Earl Hancock Ellis of the U.S. Marine Corps drafted "Plan 712, Advanced Base Operations in Micronesia," a plan for war against Japan which updated War Plan Orange by incorporating modern military technology (submarines, aircraft, etc.) and which again included an island-hopping strategy. Shortly afterward, a British reporter on naval affairs, Hector Charles Bywater, publicized the prospect of a Japanese-American war in his books Seapower in the Pacific (1921) and The Great Pacific War (1925), which detailed an island-hopping strategy. The books were read not only by Americans but by senior officers of the Japanese Imperial Navy, who used "island-hopping" in their successful southeast Asia offensives in 1941 and 1942.

Rationale and use 
This strategy was possible in part because the Allies used submarine and air attacks to blockade and isolate Japanese bases, weakening their garrisons and reducing the Japanese ability to resupply and reinforce them. Thus troops on islands which had been bypassed, such as the major base at Rabaul, were useless to the Japanese war effort and left to "wither on the vine".  General Douglas MacArthur greatly supported this strategy in his effort to regain the Philippines from Japanese occupation.  This strategy began to be implemented in late 1943 in Operation Cartwheel.  While MacArthur claimed to have invented the strategy, it initially came out of the Navy. While this strategy pre-dated World War II by many decades, MacArthur was the first Allied theater commander to practice this during the Allied offensive in the Pacific Theater. MacArthur's Operation Cartwheel, Operation Reckless and Operation Persecution were the first successful Allied practices of leapfrogging in terms of landing on lightly guarded beaches and very low casualties but cutting off Japanese troops hundreds of miles away from their supply routes. MacArthur said his version of leapfrogging was different from what he called island hopping, which was the style favored by the Central Pacific Area commanded by Admiral Chester Nimitz that favored direct assaults on heavily defended beaches and islands leading to massive casualties for such small parcels of land like at Tarawa, Peleliu, Saipan, Guam, Iwo Jima, and Okinawa. MacArthur worked together with Admiral William Halsey, commander of the South Pacific Area but subordinate to MacArthur in Operation Cartwheel, in perfecting leapfrogging.

MacArthur explained his and Admiral Halsey's strategy:

Advantages 
Leapfrogging would allow the United States forces to reach Japan quickly and not expend the time, manpower, and supplies to capture every Japanese-held island on the way. It would give the Allies the advantage of surprise and keep the Japanese off balance.  The overall leapfrogging strategy would involve two prongs. A force led by Admiral Chester Nimitz, with a smaller land force and larger fleet, would advance north towards the island and capture the Gilbert and Marshall Islands and the Marianas, going generally in the direction of the Bonin Islands.  The southern prong, led by General MacArthur and with larger land forces, would take the Solomons, New Guinea, the Bismarck Archipelago, advancing toward the Philippines.

Exceptions 
The principle of leapfrogging was not always followed in the Pacific. When MacArthur moved south to attack Mindanao after capturing the northern Philippines, and when he instigated the reconquest of portions of Borneo, he violated the "basic tenets" of island hopping.  In the first case, this may have been motivated by MacArthur's promise to return to the people of the Philippines as soon as possible.

See also 
 Seabee
 Unsinkable aircraft carrier

References

Bibliography 
 .
 .
 .
 

Military strategy
Pacific theatre of World War II
Military logistics